Harold Mabern Jr. (March 20, 1936 – September 17, 2019) was an American jazz pianist and composer, principally in the hard bop, post-bop, and soul jazz fields. He is described in The Penguin Guide to Jazz Recordings as "one of the great post-bop pianists".

Early life
Mabern was born in Memphis, Tennessee on March 20, 1936. He initially started learning drums before switching to learning piano. He had access to a piano from his teens, after his father, who worked in a lumber yard, saved to buy him one. Mabern learned by watching and emulating pianists Charles Thomas and Phineas Newborn Jr. Mabern attended Douglass High School, before transferring to Manassas High School; he played with saxophonists Frank Strozier, George Coleman and trumpeter Booker Little at this time, but was most influenced by Newborn, Jr. In 1954, after graduating, Mabern moved to Chicago, intending to attend the American Conservatory of Music. He was unable to afford to attend music college because of a change in his parents' financial circumstances, but had private lessons there for six months and developed his reading ability by playing with trombonist Morris Ellis' big band. He also developed by listening to Ahmad Jamal and others in clubs, and "playing and practicing 12 hours a day" for the next five years, but he remained self-taught as a pianist. Mabern went on to play with Walter Perkins' MJT + 3 and others in Chicago.

Mabern learned orchestration techniques from bassist Bill Lee, and comping and chord voicing from pianists Chris Anderson and Billy Wallace.

1959–1967
Mabern moved to New York City in 1959. According to his own account, he moved there with saxophonist Frank Strozier on November 21, 1959, checked in at a hotel and then went to Birdland, where he met Cannonball Adderley, who asked him if he wanted a gig. Mabern accepted and was shown inside, where trumpeter Harry "Sweets" Edison, who was looking for a pianist to replace the soon-to-depart Tommy Flanagan, auditioned him and offered him the place. A few weeks later, most of the members of this band then joined Jimmy Forrest for a recording in Chicago that resulted in the albums All the Gin Is Gone and Black Forrest, which were also guitarist Grant Green debut recordings.

Mabern steadily built a reputation in New York as a sideman, playing with, among others, Lionel Hampton's big band in 1960 (including a tour of Europe), the Jazztet for 18 months in the period 1961–62, accompanying vocalists, including Betty Carter, Johnny Hartman and Arthur Prysock, and working with trumpeter Donald Byrd and drummer Roy Haynes. After completing a 1963 tour with Haynes, he had a six-week engagement at the Black Hawk in San Francisco with Miles Davis. Mabern went on to spend time with J. J. Johnson in 1963–65 after being briefly with Sonny Rollins. In 1965, he also played with Lee Morgan, an association that continued on and off until the night in February 1972 that Morgan was shot dead at Slug's Saloon, with Mabern present. Mabern toured in Europe with Wes Montgomery later in 1965 as part of a band that had been together for around two years before the European tour, traveling as a quartet from gig to gig in one car. From 1965, Mabern also worked with Freddie Hubbard, Jackie McLean, Hank Mobley, Blue Mitchell (1966), Sarah Vaughan, and Joe Williams (1966–67).

1968–2019
Mabern's recording career as a leader began in 1968, after he signed for Prestige Records early that year. His first album, A Few Miles from Memphis, featured several of his own originals. Further dates for Prestige were released, and Mabern recorded approximately 20 albums as leader, for many labels. Mabern worked intermittently over a period of four decades with George Coleman, beginning in the 1960s, and including an appearance at the 1976 Newport Jazz Festival. From the early 1970s, he worked with trumpeters Clark Terry and Joe Newman, played jazz-pop electric piano with George Benson and Stanley Turrentine, was part of drummer Walter Bolden's trio (1973–74), and led his own trio with Bolden and bassist Jamil Nasser.

Among other musicians Mabern played with from this period were Milt Jackson in 1977, and Billy Harper for a tour of Japan in the same year. Four years later, Mabern toured Europe with George Coleman, and played with Eddie "Cleanhead" Vinson. The following year, Mabern played with James Moody. There were also performances and recordings with innumerable other musicians, both as leader and sideman. Mabern also worked with two piano-based groups: the Piano Choir, formed and led by Stanley Cowell from the early 1970s and featuring at least six pianists/keyboardists, and the four-player Contemporary Piano Ensemble, the latter being formed in the early 1990s to pay tribute to Phineas Newborn Jr. and touring extensively, including at the Montreal (1991) and Monterey Jazz Festivals (1996). 

Mabern had a career resurgence after his album Straight Street was a success in Japan in 1989. He visited Japan in 1990 as a member of a ten-pianist group that toured together but played and recorded separately. In the mid-1990s, Mabern toured with and led a trio of bassist Erik Applegate and drummer Ed Thigpen. In later years, he recorded extensively with his former William Paterson University student, the tenor saxophonist Eric Alexander. In 2010, Mabern received the Don Redman Heritage Award.

Mabern's repute in Japan was reflected in his signing by the Japanese label Venus, which resulted in six albums from 2002; Mabern stated in 2004 that his 2002 recording for Venus, Kiss of Fire, featuring Alexander as a guest, was his best seller. A longtime faculty member at William Paterson University (from 1981), Mabern was a frequent instructor at the Stanford Jazz Workshop. Mabern's stated piano preference was "naturally the Steinway D, but if you can't get a D, any Steinway".

In 2015, Mabern released Afro Blue, "the first of Mabern's two dozen leader dates to showcase the context in which he worked frequently during the 1960s: accompanying vocalists". "Mabern played in Britain [...] in 2017 and 2018 with a quartet featuring Alexander, and finally for two evenings with his trio at Ronnie Scott's club in May 2019." Mabern, who was a regular at Smoke (jazz club) recorded  his final four albums on the club's label Smoke Sessions.

Mabern died of a heart attack in New Jersey on 17 September 2019.

Playing style
Mabern's piano style was described as being "aggressive, very positive, crashing out chords that drop like pile drivers and warming up and down the keyboard with huge, whooping bursts of action", while, at the same time, he showed "a keen sensitivity" as "an extremely perceptive accompanist". Critic Gary Giddins identified some of the characteristics of Mabern's playing as being "blues glisses, [...] tremolos and dissonant block chords", that help to create a style "that marries McCoy Tyner's clustering modality with rippling asides that stem from [Art] Tatum". The influence of Phineas Newborn, Jr. remained noticeable: Mabern employed Newborn's "manner of playing fast lines in a two-handed octave (or two-octave) unison, and uses this device in wildly imaginative ways".

When accompanying vocalists, Mabern stated that he played with "less force, less aggression. I use the soft pedal. You don't voice the chord with the leading tone. You wait for them to sing a phrase, then fill in the space."

Discography
Years refer to the date of recording, unless an asterisk (*) is next to the year; this indicates that it is the date of initial release.

As leader/co-leader

As sideman

References

External links
[ Allmusic]
Johnson Jr., George V., Talking Jazz with Harold Mabern, Entertainment, Tuesday, July 14, 2009
 

American jazz pianists
American male pianists
Soul-jazz pianists
Hard bop pianists
1936 births
2019 deaths
Prestige Records artists
Columbia Records artists
Musicians from Memphis, Tennessee
20th-century American pianists
Jazz musicians from Tennessee
21st-century American pianists
20th-century American male musicians
21st-century American male musicians
American male jazz musicians
The Jazztet members
Sackville Records artists
Smoke Sessions Records artists